Lee Wade was an American baseball pitcher in the Negro leagues. He played from 1909 to 1919 with several teams.

References

External links

Brooklyn Royal Giants players
Chicago American Giants players
Cuban Giants players
Lincoln Giants players
Philadelphia Giants players
St. Louis Giants players
Date of birth missing
Date of death missing
Baseball pitchers